Alfred Maimane Phiri (born 22 June 1974 in Alexandra) is a South African Association football midfielder who last played for Moroka Swallows.

He spent six seasons in Turkey playing mostly for Gençlerbirliği (Turkey), but also for Vanspor and Samsunspor. In South Africa, he started his career at Alexandra United and also played for Jomo Cosmos, Ajax Cape Town, Moroka Swallows and Supersport United.

He played for South Africa national soccer team and was in part of the squad that travelled to France for the 1998 FIFA World Cup.

Honours 
 Gençlerbirliği
Turkish Cup (1): 2001

References

External links

1974 births
Living people
People from Alexandra, Gauteng
South African soccer players
South African expatriate soccer players
South Africa international soccer players
Gençlerbirliği S.K. footballers
Jomo Cosmos F.C. players
Cape Town Spurs F.C. players
Moroka Swallows F.C. players
SuperSport United F.C. players
1998 FIFA World Cup players
Association football midfielders
Samsunspor footballers
Vanspor footballers
Süper Lig players
Expatriate footballers in Turkey
South African expatriate sportspeople in Turkey
Sportspeople from Gauteng